The Battle of Beaumont on 30 August 1870 was won by Prussia during the Franco-Prussian War.

It was fought between the French V Corps under general Pierre Louis Charles de Failly, and IV Corps under general Constantin von Alvensleben, XII Corps under Prince Georg of Saxony along with the I Royal Bavarian Corps under general Ludwig Freiherr von der Tann. The French were surprised in their cantonments and driven back upon Mouzon, with losses of 7,500 men and 42 guns to the Germans' 3,400.

References

Bibliography
 
 
 

1870 in France
Conflicts in 1870
Battles involving France
Battles of the Franco-Prussian War
Battles involving Prussia
Beaumont
History of Ardennes (department)
August 1870 events